= Barretts Point =

Coordinates: 44°39′35″N 87°45′07″W

Barretts Point is a cape in Kewaunee County, Wisconsin.

It was associated with the Barrette-LeRoy Dock near Dyckesville in Red River township Kewaunee country, and served the community in the late 1800s until 1920 as an important shipping point. There was a lumber yard, general store at the site.
